Zoophilia is a paraphilia in which a person experiences a sexual fixation on non-human animals. Bestiality instead refers to cross-species sexual activity between humans and non-human animals. Because of the lack of research on the subject, it is difficult to conclude how prevalent bestiality is. Zoophilia on the other hand, was estimated that to be prevalent in 2% of the population in 2021. The historical perspective on zoophilia and bestiality varies greatly, from the prehistoric era, where depictions of bestiality appear in European rock art, to the Crow and Ojibwe tribes where bestiality was a historically accepted practice, to the Middle Ages, where bestiality was met with execution. In many parts of the world, bestiality is illegal under animal abuse laws or laws dealing with sodomy or crimes against nature.

Terminology

General
Three key terms commonly used in regards to the subject—zoophilia, bestiality, and zoosexuality—are often used somewhat interchangeably. Some researchers distinguish between zoophilia (as a persistent sexual interest in animals) and bestiality (as sexual acts with animals), because bestiality is often not driven by a sexual preference for animals. Some studies have found a preference for animals is rare among people who engage in sexual contact with animals. Furthermore, some zoophiles report they have never had sexual contact with an animal. People with zoophilia are known as "zoophiles", though also sometimes as "zoosexuals", or even very simply "zoos". Zooerasty, sodomy, and zooerastia are other terms closely related to the subject but are less synonymous with the former terms, and are seldom used. "Bestiosexuality" was discussed briefly by Allen (1979), but never became widely established. Ernest Bornemann coined the separate term zoosadism for those who derive pleasure – sexual or otherwise – from inflicting pain on animals. Zoosadism specifically is one member of the Macdonald triad of precursors to sociopathic behavior.

Zoophilia
The term zoophilia was introduced into the field of research on sexuality in Psychopathia Sexualis (1886) by Krafft-Ebing, who described a number of cases of "violation of animals (bestiality)", as well as "zoophilia erotica", which he defined as a sexual attraction to animal skin or fur. The term zoophilia derives from the combination of two nouns in Greek: ζῷον (zṓion, meaning "animal") and φιλία (philia, meaning "(fraternal) love"). In general contemporary usage, the term zoophilia may refer to sexual activity between human and non-human animals, the desire to engage in such, or to the specific paraphilia (i.e., the atypical arousal) which indicates a definite preference for animals over humans as sexual partners. Although Krafft-Ebing also coined the term zooerasty for the paraphilia of exclusive sexual attraction to animals, .

Zoosexuality

The term zoosexual was proposed by Hani Miletski in 2002 as a value-neutral term. Usage of zoosexual as a noun (in reference to a person) is synonymous with zoophile, while the adjectival form of the word – as, for instance, in the phrase "zoosexual act" – may indicate sexual activity between a human and an animal. The derivative noun "zoosexuality" is sometimes used by self-identified zoophiles in both support groups and on internet-based discussion forums to designate sexual orientation manifesting as sexual attraction to animals.

Bestiality

Some zoophiles and researchers draw a distinction between zoophilia and bestiality, using the former to describe the desire to form sexual relationships with animals, and the latter to describe the sex acts alone. Confusing the matter yet further, writing in 1962, William H. Masters used the term bestialist specifically in his discussion of zoosadism.

Stephanie LaFarge, an assistant professor of psychiatry at the New Jersey Medical School, and Director of Counseling at the ASPCA, writes that two groups can be distinguished: bestialists, who rape or abuse animals, and zoophiles, who form an emotional and sexual attachment to animals. Colin J. Williams and Martin Weinberg studied self-defined zoophiles via the internet and reported them as understanding the term zoophilia to involve concern for the animal's welfare, pleasure, and consent, as distinct from the self-labelled zoophiles' concept of "bestialists", whom the zoophiles in their study defined as focused on their own gratification. Williams and Weinberg also quoted a British newspaper saying that zoophilia is a term used by "apologists" for bestiality.

Sexual arousal from watching animals mate is known as faunoiphilia.

Extent of occurrence
The Kinsey reports of 1948 and 1953 estimated the percentage of people in the general population of the United States who had at least one sexual interaction with animals as 8% for males and 5.1% for females (1.5% for pre-adolescents and 3.6% for post-adolescents females), and claimed it was 40–50% for the rural population and even higher among individuals with lower educational status. Some later writers dispute the figures, noting that the study lacked a random sample in that it included a disproportionate number of prisoners, causing sampling bias. Martin Duberman has written that it is difficult to get a random sample in sexual research, but pointed out that when Paul Gebhard, Kinsey's research successor, removed prison samples from the figures, he found the figures were not significantly changed.

By 1974, the farm population in the USA had declined by 80 percent compared with 1940, reducing the opportunity to live with animals; Hunt's 1974 study suggests that these demographic changes led to a significant change in reported occurrences of bestiality. The percentage of males who reported sexual interactions with animals in 1974 was 4.9% (1948: 8.3%), and in females in 1974 was 1.9% (1953: 3.6%). Miletski believes this is not due to a reduction in interest but merely a reduction in opportunity.

Nancy Friday's 1973 book on female sexuality, My Secret Garden, comprised around 190 fantasies from different women; of these, 23 involve zoophilic activity.

In one study, psychiatric patients were found to have a statistically significant higher prevalence rate (55 percent) of reported bestiality, both actual sexual contacts (45 percent) and sexual fantasy (30 percent) than the control groups of medical in-patients (10 percent) and psychiatric staff (15 percent). Crépault and Couture (1980) reported that 5.3 percent of the men they surveyed had fantasized about sexual activity with an animal during heterosexual intercourse. In a 2014 study, 3% of women and 2.2% of men reported fantasies about having sex with an animal. A 1982 study suggested that 7.5 percent of 186 university students had interacted sexually with an animal. A 2021 review estimated zoophilic behavior occurs in 2% of the general population.

Perspectives on zoophilia

Research perspectives 
Zoophilia has been discussed by several sciences: psychology (the study of the human mind), sexology (a relatively new discipline primarily studying human sexuality), ethology (the study of animal behavior), and anthrozoology (the study of human–animal interactions and bonds).

In the fifth edition of the Diagnostic and Statistical Manual of Mental Disorders (DSM-5), zoophilia is placed in the classification "other specified paraphilic disorder" ("paraphilias not otherwise specified" in the DSM-III and IV). The World Health Organization takes the same position, listing a sexual preference for animals in its ICD -10 as "other disorder of sexual preference". In the DSM-5, it rises to the level of a diagnosable disorder only when accompanied by distress or interference with normal functioning.

Zoophilia may be covered to some degree by other fields such as ethics, philosophy, law, animal rights and animal welfare. It may also be touched upon by sociology which looks both at zoosadism in examining patterns and issues related to sexual abuse and at non-sexual zoophilia in examining the role of animals as emotional support and companionship in human lives, and may fall within the scope of psychiatry if it becomes necessary to consider its significance in a clinical context. The Journal of Forensic and Legal Medicine (Vol. 18, February 2011) states that sexual contact with animals is almost never a clinically significant problem by itself; it also states that there are several kinds of zoophiles:

Human-animal role-players
Romantic zoophiles
Zoophilic fantasizers
Tactile zoophiles
Fetishistic zoophiles
Sadistic bestials
Opportunistic zoophiles
Regular zoophiles
Exclusive zoophiles

Romantic zoophiles, zoophilic fantasizers, and regular zoophiles are the most common, while sadistic bestials and opportunistic zoophiles are the least common.

Zoophilia may reflect childhood experimentation, sexual abuse or lack of other avenues of sexual expression. Exclusive desire for animals rather than humans is considered a rare paraphilia, and sufferers often have other paraphilias with which they present. Zoophiles will not usually seek help for their condition, and so do not come to the attention of psychiatrists for zoophilia itself.

The first detailed studies of zoophilia date prior to 1910. Peer reviewed research into zoophilia in its own right started around 1960. However, a number of the most oft-quoted studies, such as Miletski, were not published in peer-reviewed journals. There have been several significant modern books, from psychologists William H. Masters (1962) to Andrea Beetz (2002); their research arrived at the following conclusions:

Most zoophiles have (or have also had) long term human relationships as well or at the same time as bestial ones, and that bestial partners are usually dogs and/or horses.
Zoophiles' emotions and care for animals can be real, relational, authentic and (within animals' abilities) reciprocal, and not just a substitute or means of expression. Beetz believes zoophilia is not an inclination which is chosen.
 Society in general is considerably misinformed about zoophilia, its stereotypes, and its meaning. The distinction between zoophilia and zoosadism is a critical one to these researchers, and is highlighted by each of these studies. Masters (1962), Miletski (1999) and Weinberg (2003) each comment significantly on the social harm caused by misunderstandings regarding zoophilia: "This destroy[s] the lives of many citizens".

Andrea Beetz also states:

More recently, research has engaged three further directions: the speculation that at least some animals seem to enjoy a zoophilic relationship assuming sadism is not present, and can form an affectionate bond.

Beetz described the phenomenon of zoophilia/bestiality as being somewhere between crime, paraphilia and love, although she says that most research has been based on criminological reports, so the cases have frequently involved violence and psychiatric illness. She says only a few recent studies have taken data from volunteers in the community. As with all volunteer surveys and sexual ones in particular, these studies have a potential for self-selection bias.

Medical research suggests that some zoophiles only become aroused by a specific species (such as horses), some zoophiles become aroused by multiple species (which may or may not include humans), and some zoophiles are not attracted to humans at all.

Historical and cultural perspectives

Instances of zoophilia and bestiality have been found in the Bible, but the earliest depictions of bestiality have been found in a cave painting from at least 8000 BC in the Northern Italian Val Camonica a man is shown about to penetrate an animal. Raymond Christinger interprets the cave painting as a show of power of a tribal chief, it is unknown if this practice was then more acceptable, and if the scene depicted was usual or unusual or whether it was symbolic or imaginary. According to the Cambridge Illustrated History of Prehistoric Art, the penetrating man seems to be waving cheerfully with his hand at the same time. Potters of the same time period seem to have spent time depicting the practice, but this may be because they found the idea amusing. The anthropologist Dr "Jacobus X", said that the cave paintings occurred "before any known taboos against sex with animals existed". William H. Masters claimed that "since pre-historic man is prehistoric it goes without saying that we know little of his sexual behavior"; depictions in cave paintings may only show the artist's subjective preoccupations or thoughts.

Pindar, Herodotus, and Plutarch claimed the Egyptians engaged in ritual congress with goats. Such claims about other cultures do not necessarily reflect anything about which the author had evidence, but may be a form of propaganda or xenophobia, similar to blood libel.

Bestiality has been accepted in a few North American and Middle Eastern indigenous cultures.

Several cultures built temples (Khajuraho, India) or other structures (Sagaholm, barrow, Sweden) with zoophilic carvings on the exterior, however at Khajuraho, these depictions are not on the interior, perhaps depicting that these are things that belong to the profane world rather than the spiritual world, and thus are to be left outside.

In the Church-oriented culture of the Middle Ages, zoophilic activity was met with execution, typically burning, and death to the animals involved either the same way or by hanging, as "both a violation of Biblical edicts and a degradation of man as a spiritual being rather than one that is purely animal and carnal". Some witches were accused of having congress with the devil in the form of an animal. As with all accusations and confessions extracted under torture in the witch trials in Early Modern Europe, their validity cannot be ascertained.

Religious perspectives
Passages in Leviticus 18 (Lev 18:23: "And you shall not lie with any beast and defile yourself with it, neither shall any woman give herself to a beast to lie with it: it is a perversion." RSV) and 20:15–16 ("If a man lies with a beast, he shall be put to death; and you shall kill the beast. If a woman approaches any beast and lies with it, you shall kill the woman and the beast; they shall be put to death, their blood is upon them." RSV) are cited by Jewish, Christian, and Muslim theologians as categorical denunciation of bestiality. However, the teachings of the New Testament have been interpreted by some as not expressly forbidding bestiality.

In Part II of his Summa Theologica, medieval philosopher Thomas Aquinas ranked various "unnatural vices" (sex acts resulting in "venereal pleasure" rather than procreation) by degrees of sinfulness, concluding that "the most grievous is the sin of bestiality". Some Christian theologians extend Matthew's view that even having thoughts of adultery is sinful to imply that thoughts of committing bestial acts are likewise sinful.

There are a few references in Hindu scriptures to religious figures engaging in symbolic sexual activity with animals such as explicit depictions of people having sex with animals included amongst the thousands of sculptures of "Life events" on the exterior of the temple complex at Khajuraho. The depictions are largely symbolic depictions of the sexualization of some animals and are not meant to be taken literally. According to the Hindu tradition of erotic painting and sculpture, having sex with an animal is believed to be actually a human having sex with a god incarnated in the form of an animal. However, in some Hindu scriptures, such as the Bhagavata Purana and the Devi Bhagavata Purana, having sex with animals, especially the cow, leads one to hell, where one is tormented by having one's body rubbed on trees with razor-sharp thorns.

Legal status 

In many jurisdictions, all acts of bestiality are prohibited; others outlaw only the mistreatment of animals, without specific mention of sexual activity. In the United Kingdom, Section 63 of the Criminal Justice and Immigration Act 2008 (also known as the Extreme Pornography Act) outlaws images of a person performing or appearing to perform an act of intercourse or oral sex with an animal (whether dead or alive). Despite the UK Ministry of Justice's explanatory note on extreme images saying "It is not a question of the intentions of those who produced the image. Nor is it a question of the sexual arousal of the defendant", "it could be argued that a person might possess such an image for the purposes of satire, political commentary or simple grossness," according to The Independent.

Many laws banning sex with animals have been made recently, such as in New Hampshire, Ohio, Germany, Sweden, Iceland, Denmark, Thailand, Costa Rica, Bolivia, and Guatemala. The number of jurisdictions around the world banning it has grown in the 2000s and 2010s.

Germany legalized bestiality in 1969, but banned it again in 2013. The 2013 law was unsuccessfully challenged before the Federal Constitutional Court in 2015.

Laws on bestiality are sometimes triggered by specific incidents. While some laws are very specific, others employ vague terms such as "sodomy" or "bestiality", which lack legal precision and leave it unclear exactly which acts are covered. In the past, some bestiality laws may have been made in the belief that sex with an animal could result in monstrous offspring, as well as offending the community. Modern anti-cruelty laws focus more specifically on animal welfare while anti-bestiality laws are aimed only at offenses to community "standards".

In Sweden, a 2005 report by the Swedish Animal Welfare Agency for the government expressed concern over the increase in reports of horse-ripping incidents. The agency believed animal cruelty legislation was not sufficient to protect animals from abuse and needed updating, but concluded that on balance it was not appropriate to call for a ban. In New Zealand, the 1989 Crimes Bill considered abolishing bestiality as a criminal offense, and instead viewing it as a mental health issue, but they did not, and people can still be prosecuted for it. Under Section 143 of the Crimes Act 1961, individuals can serve a sentence of seven years duration for animal sexual abuse and the offence is considered 'complete' in the event of 'penetration'.

Copulating with a female alpaca is still specifically against the law in Peru.

As of 2022, bestiality is illegal in 48 U.S. states. Most state bestiality laws were enacted between 1999 and 2022. Until 2005, there was a farm near Enumclaw, Washington that was described as an "animal brothel", where people paid to have sex with animals. After an incident on 2 July 2005, when a man was pronounced dead in the emergency room of the Enumclaw community hospital after his colon ruptured due to having had anal sex with a horse, the farm garnered police attention. The state legislature of the State of Washington, which had been one of the few states in the United States without a law against bestiality, within six months passed a bill making bestiality illegal. Arizona, Alaska, Florida, Alabama, New Jersey, New Hampshire, Ohio, Texas, Vermont, and Nevada have banned sex with animals since 2006, with the latter five all banning it in 2017. In 2021, Wyoming and Hawaii passed legislation banning bestiality. When such laws are proposed, they are never questioned or debated.

Bestiality remains legal in two states (West Virginia and New Mexico), while 19 states have statutes that date to the 19th century or even the Colonial period. The recent statutes are distinct from older sodomy statutes in that they define the proscribed acts with precision.

Pornography 

In the United States, zoophilic pornography would be considered obscene if it did not meet the standards of the Miller Test and therefore is not openly sold, mailed, distributed or imported across state boundaries or within states which prohibit it. Under U.S. law, 'distribution' includes transmission across the Internet.

Similar restrictions apply in Germany (see above). In New Zealand, the possession, making or distribution of material promoting bestiality is illegal.

While bestiality is illegal across Australia, the first state to also ban animal pornography was New South Wales.

The potential use of media for pornographic movies was seen from the start of the era of silent film. Polissons and Galipettes (re-released 2002 as "The Good Old Naughty Days") is a collection of early French silent films for brothel use, including some animal pornography, dating from around 1905 – 1930.

Material featuring sex with animals is widely available on the internet. An early film to attain great infamy was "Animal Farm", smuggled into Great Britain around 1980 without details as to makers or provenance. The film was later traced to a crude juxtaposition of smuggled cuts from many of Bodil Joensen's 1970s Danish movies.

In Hungary, where production faces no legal limitations, zoophilic materials have become a substantial industry that produces a number of films and magazines, particularly for Dutch companies such as Topscore and Book & Film International, and the genre has stars such as "Hector", a Great Dane dog starring in several films.

In Japan, animal pornography is used to bypass censorship laws, often featuring models performing fellatio on animals, because oral penetration of a non-human penis is not in the scope of Japanese pixelization censorship. While primarily underground, there are a number of animal pornography actresses who specialize in bestiality movies.

In the United Kingdom, Section 63 of the Criminal Justice and Immigration Act 2008 criminalises possession of realistic pornographic images depicting sex with animals (see extreme pornography), including fake images and simulated acts, as well as images depicting sex with dead animals. The law provides for sentences of up to two years in prison; a sentence of 12 months was handed down in one case in 2011.

Zoophiles

Non-sexual zoophilia 
The love of animals is not necessarily sexual in nature. In psychology and sociology the word "zoophilia" is sometimes used without sexual implications. Being fond of animals in general, or as pets, is accepted in Western society, and is usually respected or tolerated. However, the word zoophilia is used to mean a sexual preference towards animals, which makes it a paraphilia. Some zoophiles may not act on their sexual attraction to animals. People who identify as zoophiles may feel their love for animals is romantic rather than purely sexual, and say this makes them different from those committing entirely sexually motivated acts of bestiality.

Zoophile community
An online survey which recruited participants over the internet concluded that prior to the arrival of widespread computer networking, most zoophiles would not have known other zoophiles, and for the most part, zoophiles engaged in bestiality secretly, or told only trusted friends, family or partners. The internet and its predecessors made people able to search for information on topics which were not otherwise easily accessible and to communicate with relative safety and anonymity. Because of the diary-like intimacy of blogs and the anonymity of the internet, zoophiles had the ideal opportunity to "openly" express their sexuality. As with many other alternate lifestyles, broader networks began forming in the 1980s when participating in networked social groups became more common at home and elsewhere. Such developments in general were described by Markoff in 1990; the linking of computers meant that people thousands of miles apart could feel the intimacy akin to being in a small village together. The popular newsgroup alt.sex.bestiality, said to be in the top 1% of newsgroup interest (i.e. number 50 out of around 5000), – and reputedly started in humor – along with personal bulletin boards and talkers, chief among them Sleepy's multiple worlds, Lintilla, and Planes of Existence, were among the first group media of this kind in the late 1980s and early 1990s. These groups rapidly drew together zoophiles, some of whom also created personal and social websites and Internet Forums. By around 1992–1994, the wide social net had evolved. This was initially centered around the above-mentioned newsgroup, alt.sex.bestiality, which during the six years following 1990 had matured into a discussion and support group. The newsgroup included information about health issues, laws governing zoophilia, bibliography relating to the subject, and community events.

Weinberg and Williams observe that the internet can socially integrate an incredibly large number of people. In Kinsey's day contacts between animal lovers were more localized and limited to male compatriots in a particular rural community. Further, while the farm boys Kinsey researched might have been part of a rural culture in which sex with animals was a part, the sex itself did not define the community. The zoophile community is not known to be particularly large compared to other subcultures which make use of the internet, so Weinberg and Williams surmised its aims and beliefs would likely change little as it grew. Those particularly active on the internet may not be aware of a wider subculture, as there is not much of a wider subculture, Weinberg and Williams felt the virtual zoophile group would lead the development of the subculture.

Websites aim to provide support and social assistance to zoophiles (including resources to help and rescue abused or mistreated animals), but these are not usually well publicized. Such work is often undertaken as needed by individuals and friends, within social networks, and by word of mouth.

Zoophiles tend to experience their first zoosexual feelings during adolescence, and tend to be secretive about it, hence limiting the ability for non-Internet communities to form.

See also

References and footnotes

External links

 Encyclopedia of Human Sexuality entry for "Bestiality" at Sexology Department of Humboldt University, Berlin.
 Zoophilia References Database Bestiality and zoosadism criminal executions.
 Animal Abuse Crime Database search form for the U.S. and UK.

 
Animals and humans
Paraphilias
Cruelty to animals
Sexual misconduct